Minor Shadows is the second album by experimental electronic group 1 Mile North. It was released in 2003 by Ba Da Bing Records.

Track listing 
 "In 1983 He Loved To Fly"
 "Life Indoors"
 "Return To From Where We Came"
 "The Sick"
 "Black Lines"
 "August 8:15"
 "The Manual"

References 

2003 albums
1 Mile North albums
Ba Da Bing Records albums